Sigurd Frosterus (18 June 1876 – 2 March 1956) was a Finnish architect, art critic and art collector.

Born in Asikkala, Frosterus graduated from Helsinki University with a degree in art history in 1899, and earned a diploma of architecture in 1902 at Polytechnical Institute. In 1920 he earned his doctorate at the University with a dissertation on the use of colour in art.

Frosterus had an architectural office in 1902–1904 with Gustaf Strengell and in 1918–1935 with Ole Gripenberg. Frosterus and Strengell designed villas and manor houses, including Tamminiemi, which was an official residence of the President of Finland from 1940 until 1981.

Frosterus's best-known work is the Stockmann department store in Helsinki. The architecture competition was held in 1916, but the building was not finished until 1930.

Frosterus inspired numerous Finnish artists with his art theories and criticism. He collected post-impressionist art.

Frosterus was the editor of Arkkitehti magazine in 1908–1911, and published books on art theory. He was also a talented watercolour painter.

Selected works 
 Inkeroinen power plant in Kymi 1923
 Vanajanlinna Manor, 1924
 Stockmann, Helsinki centre 1930
 Isohaara power plant in Kemijoki 1949
 Helsingin säästöpankki, bank head office, 1932
 Yhdyspankki, bank head office, 1936

References 

1876 births
1956 deaths
20th-century Finnish architects
Finnish art historians‎